Nossa TV (Eng: Our TV) is a Brazilian satellite television service of R.R. Soares' International Church of God's Grace. The service was officially launched on 14 September 2007 in the metropolitan regions of São Paulo and Rio de Janeiro, but now operates in 26 states and the Federal District. Nossa TV also operates in Canada and other countries. The service uses the Direct To Home system. In 2010, Nossa TV began to migrate to DVB-S2.

References

External links
Nossa TV Brazil
Nossa TV Canada

Television networks in Brazil
2007 establishments in Brazil